Race Against Time is a 2000 Canadian film directed by Geoff Murphy.
It received an Emmy Award nomination for special effects.

Synopsis
A man enters into an agreement to sell his body for organ transplants to pay for surmounting bills for his dying son's hospital stay. When advised that the doctors want to immediately claim his organs, he goes on the run.

Cast

Awards
 2001 nominated Primetime Emmy Award for Outstanding Special Visual Effects
 2000 nominated Motion Picture Sound Editors Golden Reel Awards Golden Reel Award for Outstanding Achievement in Sound Editing – Series 1 Hour – Effects / Foley

References

External links 
 

2000s Canadian films
2000 films
Films directed by Geoff Murphy
Films shot in Canada
Films set in Canada
1970s English-language films